The 1924–25 WCHL season was the fourth season for the Western Canada Hockey League. With the collapse of the Pacific Coast Hockey Association (PCHA), two teams, the Vancouver Maroons and Victoria Cougars joined the WCHL. Six teams played 28 games each.

Regular season

Final standings
Note: W = Wins, L = Losses, T = Ties, GF= Goals For, GA = Goals Against, Pts = Points

Playoffs
The Victoria Cougars defeated the Saskatoon Crescents in the WCHL semi-final.

Source: Coleman(1966)

The Victoria Cougars then defeated the Calgary Tigers in the WCHL final.

Source: Coleman(1966)

Stanley Cup Final

The Victoria Cougars faced the National Hockey League champion Montreal Canadiens in a best-of-5 series for the Stanley Cup.  Victoria defeated Montreal, 3 games to 1, marking the only time since the inception of the NHL in 1917 that the NHL champion did not win the Cup and the final time this would happen.

Source: Coleman(1966)

Player statistics

Scoring leaders

Goaltending averages

Source: Coleman(1966)

See also
1924–25 NHL season

References

External links
HockeyDB

Western Canada Hockey League seasons
WCHL